Talda (Taldu) is a rural locality (a selo) and the administrative centre of Taldinskoye Rural Settlement, Ust-Koksinsky District, the Altai Republic, Russia. The population was 706 as of 2016. There are 9 streets.

Geography 
Talda is located 61 km northwest of Ust-Koksa (the district's administrative centre) by road. Abay and Sugash are the nearest rural localities.

References 

Rural localities in Ust-Koksinsky District